Katja Špur  (20 November 1908 – 18 December 1991) was a Yugoslav journalist, writer, poet and translator. She wrote poetry, children's books and contributed articles to numerous journals, newspapers and children's magazines. She won the Levstik Award for her journalistic work in 1949. She graduated from the Facility of Social Sciences at the University of Ljubljana subsequently working as a journalist and educator as well as translator from Bulgarian into Slovene.

Bibliography 
 For children and young adults
 Zdaj pa šalo na stran (Now, That's Enough Kidding), article in children's magazine Kurirček, 1991
 Babice nimajo vedno prav (Grandma's Are Not Always Right), article in children's magazine Kurirček, 1989
 Pri materi (At Mother's), 1984
 Mojca reši račko (Mojca Saves the Duck), 1984
 Mojčine dogodivščine (My Adventures), 1984
 Muce na obisku (Cats for A Visit), 1984
 Potepuški poni (The Travelling Pony), 1984
 Zvesti čuvaj (The Dedicated Guard), 1984
 Sošolca (Schoolfriends), 1977
 Prva knjiga o rastlinah (First Book on Plants), 1951

 Other
 Ljubezen je bolečina (Love is Pain), 1980
 Vezi (Bonds), 1970
 Slepa v pregnanstvu (Blind In Exile), 1963
 Dva studenca (Two Streams), 1958
 50.000 hektarov (50,000 hectares), 1948

References

1908 births
1991 deaths
Yugoslav poets
Yugoslav journalists
Yugoslav translators
Levstik Award laureates
People from the Municipality of Ljutomer